The 1995 K League Championship was the third competition of the K League Championship, and was held to decide the 13th champions of the K League. It was contested between winners of two stages of the regular season. It was going to be played over two legs, but a rematch was added because the aggregate score was tied.

Qualified teams

First leg

Second leg

Replay

See also
 1995 K League

External links
RSSSF
 
 

K League Championship
K